This is a list of destinations that were served by German airline Germania as of July 2018. This list does not include any flights that were operated by its Swiss subsidiary Germania Flug. Germania ceased operations on 4 February 2019.

Destinations

Annotations

References

Lists of airline destinations